Seasonal lakes of Pivka is a group of 17 seasonal lakes; the most well known are Lake Petelinje and Lake Palčje, which is the biggest of them at about . They are all located in Pivka Basin, Inner Carniola, Slovenia. There are also two areas (polje) that are only inundated during intense floods, so they are not officially considered Seasonal lakes of Pivka.

The lakes are situated on a rocky terrace in the Upper Pivka Basin at the foothills of the Javorniki range, rising above the Pivka riverbed. The terrace is dotted with a number of depressions with flat bottoms and sharp transitions at the banks, deep enough to reach the level of groundwater fluctuation. Thus, they are inundated after periods of stronger precipitation (late autumn and spring).

List of lakes 
There are total of 19 seasonal lakes, of which 17 are officially recognized. They are all listed from north to south in a table below:

Protection 
First attempts to protect seasonal lakes date back to 1960s, but even after declaring Lake Petelinje and Lake Palčje as living natural monuments (class II) of national significance, they were still used for military purposes. In 1984, Municipality of Postojna issued a decree declaring Lake Palčje, Lake Petelinje and Minor & Major Lake Drskovče natural monuments and a decade later it expanded to 13 lakes. Despite this, the army still used Lake Palčje and Lake Petelinje, and other areas were becoming overgrown due to discontinuation of farming, so the area continued to degrade. Now, Lake Palčje and Lake Petelinje are protected as Natural Values of national significance, and other lakes as Natural Values of local significance. The lakes are also part of the Ecologically Important Area Snežnik-Pivka, the Special Protection Area Snežnik-Pivka, and the Conditionally Special Protection Area Javorniki-Snežnik.

In 2014, Seasonal lakes of Pivka regional park was established, encompassing all lakes in the Municipality of Pivka.

References 

Lakes of Inner Carniola
Wetlands in Inner Carniola
Municipality of Pivka
Municipality of Ilirska Bistrica
Municipality of Postojna